Liolaemus zabalai is a species of lizard in the family Iguanidae.  It is from Chile.

References

zabalai
Lizards of South America
Reptiles of Chile
Endemic fauna of Chile
Reptiles described in 2015
Taxa named by Jaime Troncoso-Palacios
Taxa named by Hugo A. Díaz
Taxa named by Damien Esquerré